The Man Who Had His Hair Cut Short is a 1947 novel by the Flemish writer Johan Daisne. It tells the story of a teacher at a girls' school who falls in love with one of his students; he moves from the town and changes profession in order to avoid her, and slowly begins to grow insane. The novel was published in English in 1965, translated by S. J. Sackett. It was adapted into a 1966 film with the same title directed by André Delvaux.

References

1947 Belgian novels
Dutch-language novels
Belgian novels adapted into films
Novels set in Belgium